Eitan Na'eh is an Israeli diplomat, currently ambassador to Bahrain.

Diplomatic career

Turkey 
Na'eh was appointed Israel's ambassador to Turkey on November 15, 2016. He presented his credentials to President Recep Tayyip Erdoğan on December 5, 2016, at the Presidential Complex in Ankara.

In May 2018, the Turkish Ministry of Foreign Affairs expelled Na'eh in response to the killing of 60 Palestinians by Israeli forces. The Turkish government invited journalists to film a security check conducted on Na'eh as he left the country. The Israeli Ministry of Foreign Affairs protested the check.

UAE 
In January 2021, Israel opened an embassy in Abu Dhabi in the United Arab Emirates (UAE), with Na'eh serving as head of the mission. In November of that year he began working at the embassy in Manama.

Personal life 
Na'eh's wife is from Manchester, England.

References

External links 

 

Israeli diplomats
Ambassadors of Israel to Turkey
Ambassadors of Israel to Azerbaijan

Living people

Year of birth missing (living people)